The 59th Infantry Division (59. Infanteriedivision) was a military division of the Wehrmacht during World War II.

History 
The 59th Infantry Division was formed in June 1944 in the Groß Born area.  It saw immediate action on the Western Front.  It had a serious equipment and training shortage due to its quick formation.  It was surrounded at the Falaise Pocket.  A little later after the division was part of 15th Army as it retreated to BrabantStad.  In October the division was part of Army Group B during The Battle of the Scheldt.  In February 1945 the division was stationed on The Rhine.  Later after the Battle of the Ruhr the division was diminished as a result of the end of the war.

Organization 
Structure in early 1944
Organization of the division in 1943:
 1034th Grenadier Regiment
 1035th Grenadier Regiment
 1036th Grenadier Regiment
 159th Artillery Regiment
 59th Fusilier Battalion
 159th Tank Destroyer Battalion
 159th Engineer Battalion
 159th Signal Battalion
 159th Divisional Supply Group

Commanders 
The division's commanders were :

 Generalleutnant Walter Poppe (July 1944 - February 1945)
 Generalleutnant Hans Kurt Hoecker (February - April 1945)

References 

Military units and formations of the Wehrmacht
1944 establishments in Germany